The concept of operational excellence was first introduced in the early 1970s by Dr. Joseph M. Juran while teaching Japanese business leaders how to improve quality. It was formalized in the United States in the 1980s in response to "the crisis" among large legacy companies whose market share was shrinking due to quality goods imported from Japan.

Operational excellence is a mindset that embraces certain principles and tools to create a culture of excellence within an organization. Operational excellence means every employee can see, deliver, and improve the flow of value to a customer.

This approach employs the tools of earlier continuous improvement methodologies, such as lean thinking, Six Sigma, OKAPI and scientific management.

Key components
There are five key components fundamental to operational excellence, illustrated in Juran's Model, that lead to better business results and cultural excellence.

The first component, an integrated management system (IMS), consists of a framework of processes and standards that define where the organization is going, identify the risks to getting there, mitigate them, manage change, and continuously improve. Having one single, integrated management system reduces overlap, redundancy, and conflict. Early adopters of this practice have been companies such as Exxon and Chevron utilizing Operations Integrity Management System (OIMS) and Operations Excellence Management Systems (OEMS), respectively. 

The second component, a culture of operational discipline, is commonly described as doing the right thing, the right way, every time. This culture is built upon five guiding principles developed from the United States Nuclear Navy, a high reliability organization. Those principles are integrity, questioning attitude, level of knowledge, watch team backup, and formality. These values are used to identify the behaviors expected of each and every employee and how they support the organization's mission and outcomes.

The Juran Model 
The core components principles of Juran’s model for operational excellence are as follows:

1. Grasp Juran's guiding principles that lay the foundation for excellence.

2. Move your culture from thinking about quality as a product attribute (little q) to quality as a great customer experience (Big Q).

3. Understand when and how to engage leadership and the workforce to drive performance.

4. Build an effective and efficient change infrastructure using the appropriate tools and methods.

5. Drive business process effectiveness and agility.

The Shingo Model
The Shingo Institute, an organization that awards the Shingo Prize, has identified ten "Guiding Principles in the Shingo Model" as forming the basis for building a sustainable culture of organizational excellence:

 Respect every individual
 Lead with humility
 Seek perfection
 Assure quality at the source
 Flow and pull value
 Embrace scientific thinking
 Focus on process
 Think systemically
 Create constancy of purpose
 Create value for the customer

OKAPI method

The OKAPI method was created by organizational-intelligence experts Iris Tsidon  and Maya Gal. Their system incorporates the use of a methodology of SMART KPIs (key performance indicators).

S – Specific: the more precise the KPI, the greater its value is, and the more correct the focus it provides. It is important that the KPI directs towards whatever goal is needed to achieve.
M – Measurable: a KPI is supposed to measure actions, rather than behavior.
A – Achievable: It is still possible, but hard to do. 
R – Relevant: KPIs need to be relevant to the objective to achieve, and contribute in a significant way to the organization's success.
T– Timely: Every assignment must be scheduled with a defined time table for completion

The OKAPI method identifies the main challenges facing companies striving for operational excellence:

DisconnectPeople are not connected enough to the larger business needs; rather, they are motivated by professional considerations, without considering the prices paid in the commercial aspects.

Lack of progressSome of the important tasks for the growth of the business are not progressing. People work very hard and are very devoted to their work, however, the assignments needed to perform in order to grow the business don't have priority.

Unable to change to stay competitiveIn a competitive market, the ability to adapt your management infrastructure to change is considered important. However, this process has to happen quickly and efficiently. Many organizations do not succeed in changing courses in time to keep up with their competition.

Hard to work with dataTo receive a picture of the state of the company, people dig through Excel reports. Complicated reports and their preparation consume much valuable time. Creating a system to enable the receipt of a timely, readily available picture on a current basis will add a great deal of value.

No coherent management planSystematic management is not considered important, or is not mainly used as setting it up and following a plan is not easy while still expensive. People get involved in facilitating transactions, leading business development, and creating solutions to immediate problems in the company. Managers need to learn how to delegate responsibility for their own current management, so that others can work towards the shared objectives we have defined.

Flawless execution (FLEX) methodology

Also known as PBED (Plan-Brief-Execute-Debrief), the FLEX methodology is an iterative IMS designed by fighter pilots to achieve operational excellence in combat. The methodology was adapted to a business practice in 1998. Elements of the methodology are utilised in Agile software development. As an iterative process it values adaptation of strategy to real world influences through the practice of debriefing. Debriefing is a tool utilised by organisations to drive cultural change, specifically "Nameless and Rankless" where who are and what your position is in an organisation is irrelevant when assessing results and developing solutions:

 Plan – Establish a long term strategy focused on a common purpose. A High Definition Destination (HDD) then follow the six steps:
 Set a clear, measurable and achievable team objective aligned to your HDD (alignment of the organisation)
 Identify the threats and risks to achieving the objective (define to problem)
 Identify the resources required to mitigate the threats (define the cost)
 Apply lessons learned (*this is the key step for this method, taking a lesson from a debrief and applying it to the plan)
 Develop individual objectives and tasks that align to the team objective (accountability)
 Contingency plan. (three simple steps to recover from a major disruption)

 Brief – Communicate the plan to the execution team.
 Execute – Execute the plan and focus on objectives (cultural change).
 Debrief – Measure the result of daily execution vs the plan, conduct a root cause analysis and adapt the objectives (Step 4 of the six step planning process).

Philosophically, individuals practising operational excellence within an organisation should champion simplicity over complexity. In practice this should see the self-awareness exhibited around errors and mistakes in decision making be rewarded, on the basis the lesson is learned and applied, leading to continuous improvement of day-to-day practice and end result.

See also
 Lean manufacturing
 Lean services
 Shingo Prize for Operational Excellence
 Six Sigma
 The Toyota Way
 Toyota Production System

References

Business terms
Management